Frans Page Ananias (born 1 December 1972) is a Namibian former footballer who played as a midfielder. He was capped 29 times by the Namibia national team and scored one goal, and played for Namibia at the 1998 African Cup of Nations. He played club football for African Blizzards, United Africa Tigers, African Stars and Young Ones in Namibia and FC Penzberg in Germany.

Early life
Ananias was educated at Mandume Primary School, Opawa Junior Secondary School, Otjikoto Secondary School and Cosmos High School.

Club career
Ananias started his career at Central First Division club African Blizzards, a feeder club of United Africa Tigers, before transferring to Tigers. He spent most of his career at the club, winning the Namibia FA Cup with the club in 1995 and 1996 and also the Metropolitan Shield in 1996, and he was also Tigers' top scorer in the 1995 season with 27 goals. He later had a three-year spell in German football with FC Penzberg. He later returned to Namibia and signed for African Stars in 1998. He later joined Young Ones, before returning to Tigers where he played until his retirement.

International career
In 1987, Ananias represented a pre-independence Namibia at an under-15 tournament in Gqeberha. He made his international debut for Namibia in a 3–0 defeat to Guinea in January 1995. He scored his first international goal in April 1995 against Botswana. In January 1998, Ananias was named in Namibia's final 22-man squad for the 1998 Africa Cup of Nations. Ananias made 1 appearance at the tournament. In total, he was capped 29 times by Namibia and scored once.

Coaching career
Ananias worked as an assistant manager to Willem Kapukare at Tigers and, after Kapukare was sacked in February 2009, Ananias served as caretaker manager until Brian Isaacs was appointed in August 2009.

After football
Ananias has two children. He now works as a medical courier for PathCare Namibia.

References

1972 births
Living people
Namibian men's footballers
Association football midfielders
United Africa Tigers players
African Stars F.C. players
Namibia Premier League players
Namibia international footballers
1998 African Cup of Nations players
Namibian expatriate footballers
Namibian expatriate sportspeople in Germany
Expatriate footballers in Germany